Ranoli railway station is a railway station in Ranoli town of Vadodara district on the Western Railway zone of the Indian Railways. Passenger, MEMU and Intercity trains halt here.

Station code of Ranoli is 'RNO'. It has two platforms.

Major trains

Following Intercity train halts at Ranoli railway station:

 19036 Vadodara–Ahmedabad Intercity Express

References

Railway stations in Vadodara district
Vadodara railway division
Year of establishment missing